Kgomotso Christopher (born 25 March 1979) is a South African actress and voice over artist best known for her time in Isidingo as Katlego Sibeko before joining Scandal as the character of Yvonne "YV" Langa. She is also the voice behind MTN's Interactive Voice Response system and serves as a Non-Executive Chairperson on the Naledi Theatre Awards Board of Directors.

Education and career 
Kgomotso did her Bachelor of Arts degree in Law and Politics at the University of Cape Town. She was awarded the Jules Kramer Award for Fine Arts when she graduated. In 2004 she earned a Masters of Fine Arts in Theatre Arts at Columbia University in New York City. She continued to live and work in the US and UK until 2008. Kgomotso made guest appearance on television series Madam & Eve, SOS, Backstage, and  Moferefere Lenyalong. She has made appearances in theatre productions of Romeo & Juliet, Midsummer Night's Dream, Hamlet and Dr. Faustus. On November 15, 2018 Kgomotso revealed on Instagram that she is the voice behind MTN's Interactive Voice Response system.

Filmography

Television

Film

Personal life 
Kgomotso is married to Calvin Christopher.

External links

References

South African actresses
1979 births
South African voice actresses
Living people